The Cascades Raptor Center is a nature center and wildlife hospital in Eugene, Oregon that specializes in raptor rehabilitation. As of November 2020, permanent inhabitants of the center include 37 individual birds from 21 species.

History

The Cascades Raptor Center was founded in 1987 as a 501c3 non-profit nature center and wildlife hospital, initially taking birds to schools and public events, but not allowing visitors. In early 1994 the center was moved to its current location, and it is now open to the public. The center specializes in rescuing, rehabilitating, and releasing sick, injured and orphaned birds back to the wild when possible, and providing a long term habitat for some that cannot be released into the wild because of their injuries or imprinting on humans.

Animals

The center is permanent home to about 50 individual birds representing 30 native species of raptors. In 2014, nearly 300 injured birds were treated at the center. Species at the center represent most of the raptor species found in Oregon and include barn owl, barred owl, burrowing owl, great horned owl, snowy owl, western screech owl, northern saw-whet owl, turkey vulture, bald eagle, golden eagle, osprey, ferruginous hawk, northern goshawk, northern harrier, red-shouldered hawk, red-tailed hawk, rough-legged hawk, Swainson's hawk, American kestrel, merlin, gyrfalcon, and peregrine falcon, as well as the nonnative Eurasian eagle-owl and Saker falcon.

Education

The center provides guided educational programs of various lengths for large or small groups ("take a Walk on the Wild Side", "Reading with Raptors", and staff guided private tours) and self-guided tours at the facility, and visits by staff and birds to classrooms and other venues for presentations of various lengths ("Bring the Wild Alive" and "Reading with Raptors"). All guided programs can be tailored to the needs of the group.

Notes

External links

Aviaries in the United States
Bird health
Zoos in Oregon
Wildlife rehabilitation and conservation centers
Nature centers in Oregon
Culture of Eugene, Oregon
Tourist attractions in Eugene, Oregon
Ornithological organizations in the United States
1987 establishments in Oregon
Raptor organizations
Zoos established in 1987